Canal+ Séries is a French TV channel devoted to programming series. It is part of the Les Chaînes Canal+ or the Ciné-Séries package of Canal+. The channel does not broadcast advertising.

The channel broadcasts many shows a few days after the American broadcasting (in English with French subtitles), but it also broadcasts series dubbed in French or French series. The channel also broadcasts series from other Canal+ channels (Suburgatory, The Returned, etc. ...).

The OCS channels have an exclusive contract with HBO, Canal+ Séries broadcasts rerun of HBO series. But in 2017, OCS contract with HBO became stricter, giving the complete exclusivity to OCS.

Canal+ Séries had an African version, which was replaced by Canal+ Elles on 15 October 2019.

Programming

 24: Live Another Day
 30 Rock
 The Affair
 The Americans
 American Crime
 American Crime Story
 American Gods (rerun)
 American Horror Story (since season 7, seasons 1–6 in rerun)
 Anger Management
 Arrow (seasons 1–2)
 Atlantis
 Banshee
 The Big Bang Theory
 The Big C
 Braquo
 Bref
 The Bridge - Bron/Broen
 Brooklyn Nine-Nine
 Borgia
 Casual
 Catastrophe
 The Catch
 Damages
 Dexter
 Fear the Walking Dead
 Feud
 Frikjent (Acquitted)
 Game of Thrones (Game of Thrones : Le Trône de fer, rerun, seasons 1–5)
 Generation War
 Girls (rerun, seasons 1–4)
 Glue
 Go On
 Halt and Catch Fire
 Hannibal
 Hard
 Hello Ladies (syndication)
 Hit & Miss
 Homeland
 Hostages (Israel)
 House of Cards (U.S, seasons 1–3)
 I Just Want My Pants Back
 In the Flesh 
 Kaboul Kitchen
 Killing Eve
 Lascars
 The Last Man on Earth
 Last Resort
 Lilyhammer
 Looking (rerun)
 Luck (rerun)
 Luther
 Mad Men
 Mafiosa
 Maison Close
 Midnight Sun (Jour polaire)
 The Newsroom (rerun)
 Nurse Jackie
 The Office (U.S)
 Parks and Recreation
 Partners
 Platane
 Pose
 Prey
 Ray Donovan
 Republican Gangsters (Baron noir)
 The Returned (Les Revenants, France)
 Revenge
 Royal Pains
 Scandal
 Shameless (U.S, seasons 1–6)
 Skins (U.K)
 Southcliffe
 Spiral (Engrenages)
 The Spoils of Babylon
 Spooks (MI-5)
 Strike Back
 Suburgatory
 Super Fun Night
 The Strain
 This Is Us
 Those Who Kill 
 Togetherness
 Trial & Error
 The Tunnel (Tunnel)
 Twin Peaks (rerun)
 Twin Peaks: The Return (Twin Peaks)
 Two and a Half Men (Mon oncle Charlie)
 Utopia (U.K)
 Veep (rerun, seasons 1–4)
 Vikings
 Versailles
 Wayward Pines
 Weeds
 WorkinGirls
 World Without End (Un monde sans fin)
 Young Sheldon
 You're the Worst

References

Television stations in France
Séries
Television channels and stations established in 2013